Appin near Bennettsville, South Carolina dates from 1875. The boundaries of the listed property were increased to include more, perhaps outbuildings or secondary structures, dating from 1870, in 2007 It is a two-story farmhouse associated with its second owner, Charles Spencer McCall. He was a veteran of the Civil War, a local business man, mayor of Bennettsville, and member of the South Carolina Senate.

It was listed on the National Register of Historic Places in 1982.

References

Houses on the National Register of Historic Places in South Carolina
Houses completed in 1875
Houses in Marlboro County, South Carolina
National Register of Historic Places in Marlboro County, South Carolina